Musik, dans & party is a 1985 studio album by Sten & Stanley.

Track listing
Glöm inte bort mig än (Quando un amore se ne va)
Dra dit pepparn växer (Don't Play a Sad Song after Midnight)
Farväl till sommaren
Syner i lövsprickningen
Då och nu (Jersey Girl)
Kom hem igen (Komm heim zu mir)
Du är den ende som jag tänder på (Excitable)
Längtan är en svala (Love is a Rainbow)
Dansa samba (Malanotte no)
Minnenas väg (Que cansada estoy)
Var rädd om den som har dig riktigt kär
Jag kunde aldrig glömma digNära (Cara)
Hemlig kärlek (Part-time Lover)

Charts

References 

1985 albums
Sten & Stanley albums